Hemorphin-4 is an endogenous opioid peptide of the hemorphin family which possesses antinociceptive properties and is derived from the β-chain of hemoglobin in the bloodstream. It is a tetrapeptide with the amino acid sequence Tyr-Pro-Trp-Thr. Hemorphin-4 has affinities for the μ-, δ-, and κ-opioid receptors that are in the same range as the structurally related β-casomorphins, although affinity to the κ-opioid receptor is markedly higher in comparison. It acts as an agonist at these sites. Hemorphin-4 also has inhibitory effects on angiotensin-converting enzyme (ACE), and as a result, may play a role in the regulation of blood pressure. Notably, inhibition of ACE also reduces enkephalin catabolism.

See also
 Casomorphin

References

Delta-opioid receptor agonists
Kappa-opioid receptor agonists
Mu-opioid receptor agonists
Opioid peptides
Tetrapeptides